Chan Sen, also written as Chansen is a tambon (subdistrict) in Takhli District, Nakhon Sawan Province, upper central Thailand.

History
Chan Sen's history dates back more than 2,000–3,000 years and is considered an ancient town in the late Iron Age and continued until the early Dvaravati period, contemporary with Funan in present-day Vietnam and Suphan Buri's U Thong.  This is confirmed by the discovery of human skeletons, fragments of pottery, stone axes and iron tools on Khao Chong Khae Hill in the area and at Ban Mai Chaimongkol Village in its district as well as the neighbouring areas.

The condition of the ancient town of Chan Sen was first discovered from aerial photographs in 1966 by Thai architect and national artist Nij Hincheerana.

In addition, Chan Sen used to be an important trading route in the Lop Buri–Pasak basin.

Geography
The topography can be divided into two main parts: non-irrigated area, an upland; and irrigated area which is a lowland.

The area is bounded by other subdistricts (from the north clockwise): Huai Hom in its district, Lat Thippharot in its district and Sai Huai Kaeo with Phai Yai in Ban Mi District of Lop Buri Province, Thong En in In Buri District of Sing Buri Province, Soi Thong, Phrom Nimit, and Chong Khae in its district, respectively.

Chan Sen has a total area of 35,634 rai or approximately 64.178 km2.

Administration

Central administration
The entire area is governed by the Subdistrict Administrative Organization Chan Sen (SAO Chan Sen).

Local administration
It was also divided into 10 muban (village)

Population
Chan Sen has a total population of 6,259 in 1,627 households.

Places
Wat Chan Sen
Chan Sen Museum
Chan Sen Ancient Town
Chansen railway station

Notes

External links
 
Tambon of Nakhon Sawan Province
Historic districts in Thailand